The Deception is a 1909 American silent short drama film directed by D. W. Griffith.

Cast
 Herbert Yost (also credited Barry O'Moore) as Harvey Colton 
 Florence Lawrence as Mabel Colton
 Linda Arvidson
 Adele DeGarde as At Laundry
 Anita Hendrie as At Laundry
 Charles Inslee as Landlord
 Arthur V. Johnson as Man in Top Hat / Rich Patron's Secretary
 Min Johnson as At Laundry
 David Miles as At Laundry / At Conservatory
 Owen Moore as Rich Patron
 Mack Sennett as Doctor
 Harry Solter as Harvey's Friend
 Dorothy West as At Laundry

References

External links
 

1909 films
1909 drama films
1909 short films
Silent American drama films
American silent short films
American black-and-white films
Films directed by D. W. Griffith
1900s American films